The 1961 NAIA men's basketball tournament was held in March at Municipal Auditorium in Kansas City, Missouri. The 24th annual NAIA basketball tournament featured 32 teams playing in a single-elimination format. The championship game featured the 13th seeded Grambling and the third seeded Georgetown. For the first time since seeding, in 1958, the third-place game featured the first and second seeds, Northern Michigan, and Westminster.

Awards and honors
Many of the records set by the 1961 tournament have been broken, and many of the awards were established much later:
Leading scorer: est. 1963
Leading rebounder: est. 1963
Player of the Year: est. 1994
All-time leading scorer; first appearance: Willis Reed, 16th Grambling (1961,63,64), 12 games 108 field goals 39 free throws 265 total points, 22.8 average per
All-time leading scorer; second appearance: Hershell West, 15th Grambling (1960,61,63), 13 games, 116 field goals, 37 free throws, 269 total points, 20.7 average per game.

1961 NAIA bracket

  * denotes overtime.

Third-place game
The third-place game featured the losing teams from the national semifinalist to determine third and fourth places in the tournament. This game was played until 1988.

See also
 1961 NCAA University Division basketball tournament
 1961 NCAA College Division basketball tournament

References

NAIA Men's Basketball Championship
Tournament
NAIA men's basketball tournament
NAIA men's basketball tournament